Breathing Space is a psychological counselling service in Scotland for people feeling depressed, or with other urgent psychological problems. It has a telephone helpline,   a web interface, and a British Sign Language webcam interface, all staffed by trained advisers who offer guidance and referral. The service is funded by the Scottish Government Health Directorate and NHS 24, and is operationally managed by NHS 24. 
 
The group is a Counselling and Psychotherapy in Scotland Recognised Counselling Skills Organisation, and works with partners including   Choose Life, Scotland's national suicide-prevention program.

See also 
 Mental health in the United Kingdom

References

External links 

Mental health organisations in the United Kingdom